One Rockwell East Tower is a condominium in Rockwell Center, Makati, Philippines. The building will be part of the One Rockwell building complex.

Design 
The West Tower is notable for being the tallest in the complex, but the East Tower is notable for its "Z" shaped condo units. The building also appears as if it is three separate buildings. The tower's design was inspired by the shape of the Banaue Rice Terraces. It has a double-height floor-to-ceiling glass panel on one end to make the views more expansive.

References 

Skyscrapers in Makati
Residential skyscrapers in Metro Manila
Residential buildings completed in 2011